Demequina sediminis is a Gram-positive bacterium from the genus Demequina which has been isolated from sediments from the Tama River in Japan.

References

External links
Type strain of Lysinimicrobium sediminis at BacDive -  the Bacterial Diversity Metadatabase

Micrococcales
Bacteria described in 2017